The Joint Committee on Taxation (JCT) is a Committee of the U.S. Congress established under the Internal Revenue Code at .

Structure
The Joint Committee is composed of ten Members: five from the Senate Finance Committee and five from the House Ways and Means Committee.

The Joint Committee is chaired on a rotating basis by the Chair of the Senate Finance Committee and the Chair of the House Ways and Means Committee. During the first Session of each Congress the House has the joint committee chair and the Senate has the vice-chair; during the second session the roles are reversed.

The Members of the Joint Committee choose the Chief of Staff of the Joint Committee, who is responsible for selecting the remainder of the staff on a nonpartisan basis.  Since May 15, 2009, the Chief of Staff of the Joint Committee has been Thomas A. Barthold.

Duties
The duties of the Joint Committee are:
 Investigating the operation, effects, and administration of internal revenue taxes
 Investigate measures and methods for the simplification of taxes
 Make reports on the results of those investigations and studies and make recommendations
 Review any proposed refund or credit of taxes in excess of $2,000,000.

With respect to the estimation of revenues for Congress, the Joint Committee serves a purpose parallel to that of the Congressional Budget Office for the estimation of spending for Congress, the Department of the Treasury for the estimation of revenues for the executive branch, and the Office of Management and Budget for the estimation of spending for the executive branch.

History
In 1924, Senator James Couzens (Michigan) introduced a resolution in the Senate for the creation of a Select Committee to investigate the Bureau of Internal Revenue. At the time, there were reports of inefficiency and waste in the Bureau and allegations that the method of making refunds created the opportunity for fraud. One of the issues investigated by the Select Committee was the valuation of oil properties. The Committee found that there appeared to be no system, no adherence to principle, and a total absence of competent supervision in the determination of oil property values.

In 1925, after making public charges that millions of tax dollars were being lost through the favorable treatment of large corporations by the Bureau, Senator Couzens was notified by the Bureau that he owed more than $10 million in back taxes. Then Treasury Secretary Andrew Mellon was believed to be personally responsible for the retaliation against Senator Couzens. At the time, Secretary Mellon was the principal owner of Gulf Oil, which had benefited from rulings specifically criticized by Senator Couzens.

The investigations by the Senate Select Committee led, in the Revenue Act of 1926, to the creation of the Joint Committee on Internal Revenue Taxation. The select committee emphasized

the need for the institution of a procedure by which the Congress could be better advised as to the systems and methods employed in the administration of the internal revenue laws with a view to the needs for legislation in the future, simplification and clarification of administration, and generally a closer understanding of the detailed problems with which both the taxpayer and the Bureau of Internal Revenue are confronted. It is more properly the function of the Senate Finance Committee and the House Ways and Means Committee, jointly, to engage in such an activity.(2)

As originally conceived by the House, a temporary "Joint Commission on Taxation" was to be created to "investigate and report upon the operation, effects, and administration of the Federal system of income and other internal revenue taxes and upon any proposals or measures which in the judgment of the Commission may be employed to simplify or improve the operation or administration of such systems of taxes.....".(1)

The Senate expanded significantly the functions contemplated by the House and transformed the proposed Joint Commission to a Joint Committee with a permanent staff. The Senate version was incorporated into the Revenue Act of 1926 and the Joint Committee was created.(3)

The first Chief of Staff of the Joint Committee on Internal Revenue Taxation was L.H. Parker, who had been the chief investigator on Senator Couzens' Select Senate Committee. The Revenue Act of 1926 required the Joint Committee on Internal Revenue Taxation to publish from time to time for public examination and analysis proposed measures and methods for the simplification of internal revenue taxes and required the Joint Committee to provide a written report to the House and Senate by December 31, 1927, with such recommendations as it deemed advisable. The Joint Committee published its initial report on November 15, 1927, and made various recommendations to simplify the federal tax system, including a recommendation for the restructuring of the federal income tax title.

In the Revenue Act of 1928, the Joint Committee's authority was extended to the review of all refunds or credits of any income, war-profits, excess-profits, or estate or gift tax in excess of $75,000. In addition, the Act required the Joint Committee to make an annual report to the Congress with respect to such refunds and credits, including the names of all persons and corporations to whom amounts are credited or payments are made, together with the amounts credit or paid to each.

Since 1928, the threshold for review of large tax refunds has been increased from $75,000 to $2 million in various steps and the taxes to which such review applies has been expanded. Other than that, the Joint Committee's responsibilities under the Internal Revenue Code have remained essentially unchanged since 1928.

While the statutory mandate of the Joint Committee has not changed significantly, the tax legislative process, however, has.

There are five members of each house on the committee, which has no subcommittees. The committee leadership (chair/vice chair and ranking member/vice ranking member) between the House and Senate at the start of each session of the congressional term (once per year).  The tables below use the leadership titles from the start of each Congress' first session.

Members, 117th Congress

Members, 116th Congress

Members, 115th Congress

Members, 114th Congress

References

External links
Official site

Taxation
Taxation in the United States
1926 establishments in Washington, D.C.